Ginzel may refer to:
Ginzel (crater) a crater on the far side of the moon
Friedrich Karl Ginzel (1850–1926), an Austrian astronomer
Jones/Ginzel an American artist team